The wedge-billed woodcreeper (Glyphorynchus spirurus), is a passerine bird which breeds in the tropical New World from southern Mexico to northern Bolivia, central Brazil and the Guianas; it is absent from the Pacific coastal areas except between Costa Rica and Ecuador. It is the only member of the genus Glyphorynchus.

It is easily distinguished from its relatives by its small size and distinctive bill. The wedge-billed woodcreeper is typically 14–15 cm long, and weighs 14–16.5 g. It has brown upperparts, with fine streaking on the head sides, a buff supercilium, and a chestnut rump, wings and tail.  The throat is buff, and the rest of the underparts are brown spotted with buff chevrons, most heavily on the breast. A buff wing bar is obvious from below in flight. The short wedge-shaped bill is quite different in shape from that of other woodcreepers. Young birds are duller with less distinct breast streaking.

The call is a sneezy . The song varies geographically, perhaps reflecting the different subspecies of this bird. In Costa Rica it is a trilled , whilst in eastern Bolivia it is an ascending .

This common and widespread small woodcreeper is found in lowlands up to 1500 m altitude, although normally below 1100 m, in damp forests, adjacent semi-open woodland and old second growth. It feeds on small spiders and insects, creeping up trunks and extracting its tiny prey from the bark. It has a strong preference for trees with fine flaky bark. It is seen alone, in pairs, or sometimes as part of a mixed-species feeding flock. Birds are largely resident, but may disperse locally. For example, a vagrant individual was observed on May 12, 1998 at Cerro Campana, El Salvador, the first record for that country.

It builds a cup nest in a narrow tree cavity such as a rotting stump or space between buttresses. It may occasionally nest up to 6 m high in a tree, but is usually much lower, often at or below ground level. It lays two white eggs between March and June.

Footnotes

References

 Herrera, Néstor; Rivera, Roberto; Ibarra Portillo, Ricardo & Rodríguez, Wilfredo (2006): Nuevos registros para la avifauna de El Salvador. ["New records for the avifauna of El Salvador"]. Boletín de la Sociedad Antioqueña de Ornitología 16(2): 1-19. [Spanish with English abstract] PDF fulltext
 Hilty, Steven L. (2003): Birds of Venezuela. Christopher Helm, London. 
 Stiles, F. Gary & Skutch, Alexander Frank (1989): A guide to the birds of Costa Rica. Comistock, Ithaca.

Further reading

wedge-billed woodcreeper
Birds of Central America
Birds of Colombia
Birds of Venezuela
Birds of Ecuador
Birds of the Amazon Basin
Birds of the Guianas
wedge-billed woodcreeper
wedge-billed woodcreeper
Birds of Brazil